Tara is a given name with multiple meanings in different cultures.

The name is popular in Ireland, the United States and Australia

It is also a common name in parts of South Asia.

In Ireland, it is derived from The Hill of Tara which is an archaeological site located near the River Boyne in County Meath, and which according to tradition, was the seat of the High King of Ireland. The name was popular in the United States during the 1970s, probably due to Tara being the name of the O'Hara's plantation in the 1939 film Gone with the Wind, and the characters Tara King in the 1960s British television series The Avengers and Tara Martin on the American soap opera All My Children in the early 1970s. In Ireland, from 2000–2005 it ranked between the 30th and 40th most popular girl's name.

Tara is also linked to the biblical name Terah and is popular in both Christianity and Judaism.

In South Asia, such as India and Nepal, Tara is a word originating from Sanskrit, meaning star, and it symbolizes the light of the soul. Tara is also used as a male or female name for Sikhs.

Since 1968 the name Tara is accepted as being a female name in Western societies, although there have been men who carried the name (such as Tara Browne). It is also often considered a female name in Asia, due to its connection to several goddesses. For instance, Tara is a female Buddha in Buddhism and Tara is also a goddess in Hinduism.

Meanings in different languages
Irish Gaelic: refers to the Hill of Tara, or Teamhair na Rí, the legendary seat of the High King of Ireland
In Serbia the name is often associated with the mountain of Tara and national park in Serbia and river Tara in Montenegro and Bosnia and Herzegovina
Sanskrit, Hindi, Urdu, Nepali, Marathi, Persian, Punjabi, Kurdish, Tamil, Bengali, Telugu, Sinhalese:  "Star"

People named Tara

Women 
Tara Allain (born 1985), beauty pageant participant
Tara Andrews (born 1994), Australian association football player
Tara (Kannada actress) (born 1967), actress in Kannada language film
Tara Aghdashloo (born 1988), Iranian writer
Tara (actress) (1944–2007), actress
Tara Lynne Barr (born 1993), American actress
Tara Alisha Berry (born 1988), Indian film actress
Tara Betts, American author
Tara Blaise (born 1975), Irish pop, folk, rock singer
Tara Bouman (born 1970), Dutch basset horn, clarinet and bass clarinet player
Tara Brabazon (born 1969), Canadian professor of communication
Tara Brach (born 1953), American psychologist and expert on Buddhist meditation
Tara Brown (born 1968), Australian television presenter
Tara Buck (born 1975), American actress
Tara Buckman (born 1956), American television and film actress
Tara Calico (born 1969), American woman who disappeared
Tara Campbell (born 1983), Canadian water polo player
Tara Cherian (born 1913-2000), Indian politician
Tara Conner (born 1985), Miss USA 2006
Tara Cox (born 1971), New Zealand association football player
Tara Cross-Battle (born 1968), American volleyball player
Tara Croxford (born 1968), Canadian field hockey player
Tara D'Souza, (born 1986), Indian film actress/model
Tara Dakides (born 1975), American snowboarder 
Tara Deshpande (born 1975), Indian actress, writer, model, and MTV VJ
Tara Dettman, Canadian music artist and songwriter
Tara Devi (1945–2006), Nepali singer
Tara Donovan (born 1969), American artist
Tara Fela-Durotoye (born 1977), Nigerian makeup artist and lawyer
Tara Fares (born 1996-2018), Iraqi model
Tara Feser (born 1980), Canadian wheelchair basketball player
Tara Fitzgerald (born 1967), English actress
Tara Flanagan (born 1964), American judge
Tara Flynn, Irish actress
Tara Anne Fonseca, Indian model
Tara George (born 1973), Canadian curler
Tara Geraghty-Moats (born 1993), American ski jumper
Tara Lynn Grant (1972–2007), American woman murdered by her husband
Tara Gray (born 1979), American beauty queen
Tara Grinstead (born 1974), American woman who is missing
Tara Lyn Hart (born 1978) Canadian singer/songwriter
Tara Dawn Holland (born 1972), Miss America 1997
Tara Hoyos-Martínez (born 1990), English beauty pageant titleholder
Tara Hudiburg, American forest scientist
Tara Hunt (born 1973), Canadian author, speaker and startup founder
Tara Hurley (born 1976), American director
Tara Iyer (born 1988), Indian tennis player
Tara Jaff, (born 1958), Iraqi Kurdish musician
Tara Jarmon, Canadian fashion designer based in Paris
Tara Karsian (born 1965), American stage and film actress
Tara Keck (born 1978), American-British Neuroscientist
Tara Kemp (born 1964), American pop and R&B singer
Tara Killian (born 1977), American film and television actress
Tara Kirk (born 1982), American swimmer
Tara LaRosa (born 1978), American mixed martial artist
Tara Lemmey, American entrepreneur, technology expert, and innovation strategist
Tara Leniston (born 1983), Irish actress
Tara Lipinski (born 1982), American figure skater
Tara Llanes (born 1976), American bicycle motocross and mountain bike racer
Tara Mack (born 1983), American politician
Tara McDonald, English songwriter and vocalist
Tara MacLean (born 1973), Canadian singer and songwriter
Tara McKelvey, American journalist
Tara McLeod, Canadian guitarist
Tara McNeill, Irish violinist, harpist, and singer
Tara McPherson (born 1976), American artist
Tara Moore (born 1992), English tennis player
Tara Moran (born 1971), English actress
Tara Morgan (born 1989), Australian rules footballer
Tara Morice (born 1964), Australian actress, singer, and dancer
Tara Moss (born 1973), Canadian-Australian author
Tara Mounsey (born 1978), American hockey player
Tara Nelson, Canadian television journalist and news anchor
Tara Newley (born 1963), American English singer and actor
Tara Nott (born 1972), American weightlifter
Tara Jane O'Neil (born 1972) (sometimes ONeil or TJO), American instrumentalist, songwriter, audio engineer, and artist
Tara Lynne O'Neill, Irish film, theatre and television actress
Tara O'Toole, American Under Secretary in the Department of Homeland Security
Tara Oram (born 1984), Canadian Country singer
Tara Osseck (born 1986), beauty pageant participant
Tara Palmer-Tomkinson (1971-2017), English socialite also known as T P-T
Tara N. Palmore, American physician-scientist and epidemiologist
Tara Parker-Pope, American author and columnist
Tara Leigh Patrick (born 1972), American model and entertainer, aka Carmen Electra
Tara Platt (born 1980), American film and television actress
Tara Priya (born 1989), American singer-songwriter and vocalist
Tara Proctor (born 1971), English footballer
Tara A. Ramsey (born 1995), American entrepreneur
Tara Reid (born 1975), American actress
Tara Rice (born 1978) Canadian singer/songwriter, vocalist for art-rock band 5th PROJEKT
Tara Rushton (born 1984), Australian model and actress
Tara Ruttledge (born 1991), Irish camogie player
Tara Ruttley, American scientist
Tara Sad, (born 1953) American politician
Tara Sands, (born 1975), American voice actress, television host and actress
Tara Govind Sapre (1919–1981), Indian National Congress politician
Tara Seibel (born 1973), American cartoonist, graphic designer and illustrator
Tara Sharma (born 1977), British-Indian actress
Tara Simmons (1984–2019), Australian musician
Tara Singh (disambiguation), several names
Tara Slone (born 1973), Canadian rock vocalist
Tara Smith (born 1973), hair stylist
Tara Smith (born 1961), American professor of philosophy
Tara Bray Smith, (born 1970), American author
Tara Snyder (born 1977), American tennis player
Tara Spencer-Nairn (born 1978), Canadian actress
Tara Rani Srivastava, Indian woman freedom fighter
Tara Stevens (born 1972), British journalist of Welsh extraction, based in Barcelona
Tara Stiles (born 1981), American model turned yoga instructor
Tara Strohmeier, American actress
Tara Strong (born 1973), Canadian-American actress and voice actress
Tara Subkoff (born 1972), American actress and fashion designer
Tara Summers (born 1979), English actress
Tara Sutaria (born 1995), Indian actress
Tara Sutton, Canadian journalist and filmmaker
Tara Teng (born 1989), Canadian abolitionist
Tara VanDerveer (born 1953), American basketball coach
Tara VanFlower, American vocalist
Tara Singh Varma (born 1948), Dutch politician
Tara Watchorn (born 1990), Canadian ice hockey player
Tara Westover (born 1986), American memoirist, essayist and historian
Tara Whitten (born 1980), Canadian track racing cyclist
Tara Lynn Wilson (born 1982), Canadian actress
Tara June Winch (born 1983), Australian writer
Tara Zahra (born 1976), American professor

Men
Tara Browne (1945–1966), London socialite
Tara Chand (Pakistani politician), Pakistani politician
Tara Singh Hayer (1936–1998), Sikh Canadian newspaper publisher
Tara Singh Malhotra (1885–1967), Sikh political and religious leader
Tara Singh Ramgarhia, 18th century Sikh leader
Tara Römer (1974–1999), French actor

Deities
Tara (Buddhism), a tantric meditation deity in Tibetan Buddhism, actually the generic name for a set of similar bodhisattvas
Tara (Devi), a Hindu goddess and consort of Shiva

Fictional characters
Tara o' Helium, a princess in the Barsoom novels of Edgar Rice Burroughs
Tara Webster, the main character in the Australian teen-oriented television drama Dance Academy
Tara, a sword and sorcery heroine in DC Comics' Warlord
Tara, an android in Marvel Comics' New Invaders
Tara in the film Shrooms
Tara in the TV series Kim Possible
Tara in The Herculoids
Tara Belle in the cartoon Beverly Hills Teens
Tara Carpenter in the 2022 film Scream 
Tara Chambler in the TV series The Walking Dead
Tara Desai in the TV series Twisted
Tara Duncan, heroine of a series of French novels by Sophie Audouin-Mamikonian
Tara Fremont, also called "Tara, the Jungle Girl" and "Too Tall Tara", a superhero in AC Comics
Tara Gregson, DID character in Showtime TV series United States of Tara
Tara King in the TV series The Avengers
Tara Knowles in the TV series Sons of Anarchy
Tara*Starr Lane in the novels P.S. Longer Letter Later and Snail Mail No More by Ann M. Martin and Paula Danziger
Tara Locke in the soap opera The Young and the Restless
Tara Maclay in the TV series Buffy the Vampire Slayer
Tara Mandal in the soap opera Coronation Street
Tara Markov, the first alter ego of Terra, in DC Comics
Tara Mehta, an incarnate deity in Virgin Comics' Devi comic book
Tara Price in the crime drama CSI: Miami
Tara Rafferty in the Irish television series Striking Out
Tara Reynolds in the soap opera Emmerdale
Tara Thornton in the TV series True Blood
Tara Wilson in the TV series The Practice and its spinoff Boston Legal

Irish feminine given names
English feminine given names
Scandinavian feminine given names
Danish feminine given names
Norwegian feminine given names
Icelandic feminine given names
Swedish feminine given names
Finnish feminine given names
Portuguese feminine given names
Spanish feminine given names
Arabic feminine given names
Scottish feminine given names
Welsh feminine given names